Graeme Alexander Lockhart Whitelaw (1863 – 23 July 1928) was a British Conservative Party politician from Scotland who represented North West Lanarkshire in the House of Commons from 1892 to 1895.

He was the second son of Alexander Whitelaw and an elder brother of William Whitelaw, grandfather of William Whitelaw, 1st Viscount Whitelaw.

Electoral history

References

External links 
 Hansard

1863 births
1928 deaths
UK MPs 1892–1895
Members of the Parliament of the United Kingdom for Scottish constituencies
Scottish Tory MPs (pre-1912)
People from Lanarkshire